Hurricane Wilma was the most intense tropical cyclone in the Atlantic basin on record in terms of minimum barometric pressure, with an atmospheric pressure of . Wilma's destructive journey began in the second week of October 2005. A large area of disturbed weather developed across much of the Caribbean and gradually organized to the southeast of Jamaica. By late on October 15, the system was sufficiently organized for the National Hurricane Center to designate it as Tropical Depression Twenty-Four.

The depression drifted southwestward, and under favorable conditions, it strengthened into Tropical Storm Wilma on October 17. Initially, development was slow due to its large size, though convection steadily organized.

Wilma weakened over the Yucatán Peninsula, and reached the southern Gulf of Mexico before accelerating northeastward. Despite increasing amounts of vertical wind shear, the hurricane re-strengthened to hit Cape Romano, Florida, as a major hurricane. Wilma weakened as it quickly crossed the state, and entered the Atlantic Ocean near Jupiter, Florida. The hurricane again re-intensified before cold air and wind shear penetrated the inner core of convection. By October 26, it transitioned into an extratropical cyclone, and the next day, the remnants of Wilma were absorbed by another extratropical storm over Atlantic Canada.

Formation

During the second week of October, an unusually large, monsoon-like lower-level circulation and a broad area of disturbed weather developed over much of the Caribbean Sea. The system was enhanced by diffluence from an upper-level low across the southwestern Atlantic. Convection increased and became slightly better organized, though upper-level wind shear initially prevented development. The system drifted westward, and early on October 14 the convection became more concentrated and a little better organized as upper-level wind shear lessened slightly.

Later on October 14, the system became much better defined, with increasingly organized shower and thunderstorm activity, as conditions in the upper levels of the atmosphere became significantly more favorable. It was then that the National Hurricane Center first indicated that it was possible for a tropical depression to develop in the area. Dvorak classifications were initiated on October 15. The system continued to organize, with the National Hurricane Center remarking the system could ultimately become a hurricane.

The depression tracked slowly westward, a motion due to weak steering currents caused by a high-pressure area to its north across the Gulf of Mexico. Initially, the center of circulation was broad without a defined inner core; forecaster Lixion Avila remarked, "The area of minimum pressure could [have been] anywhere within  of its [initial advisory position]." However, the National Hurricane Center noted in the first advisory on the depression that there were "all indications that there could a dangerous hurricane in the northwestern Caribbean Sea in 3 to 5 days." This was due to the depression being located within an environment very conducive for development, specifically low amounts of wind shear and very warm water temperatures.

As Tropical Depression Twenty-Four drifted southwestward, it steadily organized; by early on October 16, rainbands began to gradually consolidate with well-established outflow, and a large upper-level anticyclone developed over the depression. Although deep convection and banding features increased, mid-level dry air from the north prevented significant organization, and the convection was split into two primary areas. Surface buoy reports indicated that, due to its large size, the system failed to strengthen beyond tropical depression status, even though it received tropical storm strength Dvorak classifications from The National Hurricane Center's Tropical Analysis and Forecast Branch and the National Oceanic and Atmospheric Administration's Satellite Analysis Branch.

Peak strength

By early on October 17, the outer rainbands, which had previously dominated the structure of the cyclone, dissipated, while deep convection developed near and to the south of the center. Computer models predicted steady strengthening as the depression tracked westward before turning to the north. Of the intensity models, the Geophysical Fluid Dynamics Laboratory predicted an intensity of  within 36 hours, with other forecasts being more conservative in their predictions. Upon becoming a tropical storm, the National Hurricane Center predicted Wilma to track west-northwestward, reaching winds of  before striking the northeastern portion of the Yucatán Peninsula.

The storm continued to the southwest while deep convection persisted near the center. National Hurricane Center forecaster James Franklin remarked, "Confidence at the later ranges [of the forecast track] was unusually low", due to wide divergences between computer models. This was due to unusually low pressures across the region, which resulted in a lesser pressure gradient and thus lighter winds. Convection continued to develop near the center and became much more symmetrical.

Tropical Storm Wilma began to turn to the west-northwest on October 18, during which the storm developed a small, intermittent and ragged eye feature. Shortly after reaching hurricane strength, the hurricane began undergoing explosive deepening, after the development of a "pinhole" eye  in diameter.

In the span of just 24 hours, Wilma had intensified from a  tropical storm to a  Category 5 hurricane, an unprecedented event for an Atlantic hurricane. The pressure continued to fall as the hurricane hunters left the hurricane, and it is possible the pressure was slightly lower. It is estimated by Dr. Eric Uhlhorn of NOAA's Hurricane Research Division that the winds may have peaked at between 189 and 229 mph rounded to 190 and 230 mph respectively following that Hurricane Hunter mission.

First landfall

Shortly after peaking in intensity, the coldest cloud tops surrounding the eye warmed slightly and an outer eyewall began to develop, signifying an eyewall replacement cycle was occurring. At the time, the pressure measured , the second-lowest known pressure for a Category 4 hurricane (Super Typhoon Judy had an 887 mb pressure at peak intensity), and Wilma retained the large eyewall as it turned northwestward.

Steering currents remained weak, though a series of troughs eroded the high-pressure system across the Gulf of Mexico, resulting in a turn towards the north-northwest. Environmental conditions remained favorable, with the eye becoming more distinct early on October 21.

Second landfall and demise
On October 22, the mid-level ridge to the north of Wilma essentially dissipated, leaving the hurricane drifting northward across the northeastern Yucatán Peninsula. As the hurricane moved further inland, the eye became cloud-filled as the deepest convection began to warm, and the winds gradually weakened during its passage over land. Convection deepened around the eyewalls, and the inner core of convection, which had previously become disrupted over land, became slightly better defined.

A powerful eastward-moving mid-level trough across the central United States turned the hurricane northeastward and caused it to gradually accelerate. Vertical wind shear increased as strong upper-level southwesterly flow increased, though in spite of the shear Wilma continued to intensify. It gradually became better organized, with the large  eye becoming very distinct on satellite and radar imagery. Wilma was able to retain its strength because large eyes in tropical cyclones are more stable and more resistant to vertical wind shear.

Hurricane Wilma crossed the Florida peninsula in about 4.5 hours while continuing to accelerate northeastward, and emerged into the Atlantic Ocean as a weakened  hurricane near Jupiter. A vigorous cold front associated with the mid-level trough moved across the area to the west of Wilma, yet the cooler and drier air behind the front could not fully penetrate the inner core of the hurricane to weaken it. Shortly after exiting the Florida coastline, Wilma began to re-intensify, believed to be due to a reduction of friction of the eyewall and warm waters of the Gulf Stream. During the time, the large circulation of Wilma absorbed the much smaller Tropical Depression Alpha over the Bahamas.

The overall cloud pattern began to deteriorate, with the eye becoming less distinct and the convection less symmetric. By 1117 UTC on October 25, the center was located to the northwest of the primary convection as cold air from the southwest entrained the circulation. The weakening extratropical remnant turned to the east-northeast before being absorbed by another extratropical storm over Atlantic Canada on October 27.

See also

Meteorological history of Hurricane Katrina
Effects of Hurricane Wilma in Florida
Effects of Hurricane Wilma in the Bahamas
List of Florida hurricanes

References

Hurricane Wilma
Wilma
Wilma meteorological history